Gentilicamelus is an extinct genus of camelid endemic to North America.

References

Prehistoric camelids
Oligocene even-toed ungulates
Miocene even-toed ungulates
Aquitanian genus extinctions
Prehistoric mammals of North America
Rupelian genus first appearances
Fossil taxa described in 1936
Prehistoric even-toed ungulate genera